13 let Kasakhstan is a village located in the Martuk District of Aktobe Region in northwestern Kazakhstan. Population:

References 

Populated places in Aktobe Region